Francesco Boncompagni (21 January 1592 – 9 December 1641) was an Italian Cardinal, made cardinal in 1621.

Born at Sora, son of Giacomo Boncompagni, duke of Sora and Acri, and Costanza Sforza di Santa Fiore. Grand-nephew of Pope Gregory XV. He was a nephew of Cardinals by both maternal and paternal sides: Filippo Boncompagni (1572) and Francesco Sforza (1583). He was the uncle of Cardinal Girolamo Boncompagni, and grand-uncle of a second Cardinal Giacomo Boncompagni.

Filippo studied at the University of Bologna, where he earned a doctorate in utroque iure, both canon and civil law, on May 20, 1615. He entered the priesthood while in Naples, and in 1607, he became Abbot commendatario of S. Maria a Capella, Naples. He moved to Rome and was named referendary of the Tribunals of the Apostolic Signature of Justice and of Grace in 1615. He was briefly vice-governor of Fermo in 1621.

He was created cardinal deacon in the consistory of April 19, 1621; received a dispensation for having an uncle in the Sacred College of Cardinals

He participated in the conclave of 1623, which elected Pope Urban VIII. Returned to Rome in 1626. Promoted to the metropolitan see of Naples in 1626. He died in Naples and is buried in the Cathedral.

References

1592 births
1641 deaths
Francesco
17th-century Italian cardinals
Cardinal-nephews